Newcastle KB United are a defunct Australian association football club. They participated in the National Soccer League from 1978 until early in the 1984 season.

History
The first Newcastle based team to play in a national league, Newcastle KB United was formed in 1977, but did not play until 1978 one year after the inception of the Philips Soccer League (NSL).

Newcastle KB United was sponsored by Tooths Breweries (hence the KB tag) and took the NSL by storm by setting new crowd attendance records on a regular basis.  They drew some famous names to play guest matches with them with Bobby Charlton playing a game for the club in 1978, Paul Reaney joining in 1980 and Craig Johnston played once in 1978 and again in 1982.

While they often struggled to compete at the very top of the league Newcastle were regular mid table finishers and their only honour was in 1984 when they travelled to Melbourne Knights and won the national league cup 1–0, playing as the newly formed Newcastle Rosebud United. The goal was scored by Derek Todd.

KB United's NSL licence was taken over by Northern New South Wales State League club Adamstown Rosebuds in 1984 after the collapse of Newcastle KB United. Rosebuds renamed themselves Newcastle Rosebud United while they played in the NSL. They were excluded from the NSL at the end of the 1986 season when it was re-organised and returned to the NNSW League.

It would be another 5 years before Newcastle had another representative in the National Soccer League, this time via the newly formed Newcastle Breakers FC

Colours and badge
Newcastle KB United played in traditional Newcastle colours of emerald, white and cinnamon but later changed to match the KB brand to their strip and played in predominantly yellow with a red and black trim.

Stadium
Newcastle International Sports Centre now known as Energy Austria Stadium was the home ground of Newcastle KB United. It had a western stand and a circular playing area surrounded by a hill.

Supporters
Newcastle KB United set many crowd records during their time in the NSL holding the record for the largest crowd to a domestic game in this country until the formation of the A-league.  This record was 18,367 against Sydney Olympic in April 1979, a year when their average home crowd exceeded 10,000.

The local vocal support was known as "The Rowdies" and they created a great atmosphere from deep in the heart of the Western grandstand in what was known affectionately as 'The Red Section'.

~ NSL divided into 2 conferences with Newcastle Adamstown Rosebud in the Northern Conference.

Honours
 Winner National Knockout Cup: 1984 (as Newcastle Rosebuds)
1982 Winner of Prime Minister's Cup in Canberra against Canberra City NSL team

References

External links
Highlights on youtube from 1979
Youtube with Craig Johnston from 1980

Association football clubs disestablished in 1984
Defunct soccer clubs in Australia
National Soccer League (Australia) teams
Soccer clubs in Newcastle, New South Wales
Association football clubs established in 1977
1977 establishments in Australia
1984 disestablishments in Australia